The 2009 Six-red World Grand Prix (often styled the 2009 SangSom 6-red World Grand Prix for sponsorship and marketing purposes) was a six-red snooker tournament held between 7 and 12 July 2009 at the Montien Riverside Hotel in Bangkok, Thailand.

Twenty-three of the tournament's 48 competitors were on the 2009/10 professional World Snooker tour of the more established 15-red game. A relatively high proportion of competitors were from Asia.

Jimmy White won in the final 8–6 against Barry Hawkins.

Prize money
The breakdown of prize money for this year is shown below:
Winner: 1,000,000 baht
Runner-up: 500,000 baht
Semi-finalists: 250,000 baht
Quarter-finalists: 150,000 baht
Last 16: 70,000 baht
Last 32: 35,000 baht
Total: 3,720,000 baht

Round-robin stage
The top four players from each group qualified for the knock-out stage. All matches were best of 9 frames.

Group A

 Fung Kwok Wai 4–5 Judd Trump
 Mohammed Al-Joakar 2–5 Phaithoon Phonbun
 Ricky Walden 5–1 Daniel Thorp
 Phaithoon Phonbun 2–5 Judd Trump
 Daniel Thorp 1–5 Fung Kwok Wai
 Daniel Thorp 0–5 Mohammed Al-Joakar
 Ricky Walden 5–1 Fung Kwok Wai
 Mohammed Al-Joakar 0–5 Judd Trump
 Fung Kwok Wai 4–5 Phaithoon Phonbun
 Ricky Walden 1–5 Judd Trump
 Daniel Thorp 5–4 Phaithoon Phonbun
 Ricky Walden 5–0 Mohammed Al-Joakar
 Ricky Walden 2–5 Phaithoon Phonbun
 Fung Kwok Wai 5–2 Mohammed Al-Joakar
 Daniel Thorp 1–5 Judd Trump

Group B

 Alex Borg 5–2 Akar Soe Yin	
 Aditya Mehta 5–4 James Wattana
 Alex Borg 2–5 Nigel Bond
 Shaun Murphy 5–3 Akar Soe Yin
 James Wattana 5–1 Nigel Bond
 Alex Borg 5–4 Aditya Mehta
 Akar Soe Yin 3–5 Nigel Bond
 Shaun Murphy 5–1 Aditya Mehta
 Shaun Murphy 5–3 James Wattana
 Shaun Murphy 5–2 Alex Borg
 Aditya Mehta 5–1 Nigel Bond
 Akar Soe Yin 1–5 James Wattana
 Shaun Murphy 1–5 Nigel Bond
 Aditya Mehta 1–5 Akar Soe Yin
 Alex Borg 1–5 James Wattana

Group C

 Noppadon Noppachorn 4–5 Matthew Stevens
 John Higgins 0–5 Muhammad Sajjad
 Sascha Lippe 5–3 Habib Subah
 John Higgins 5–1 Matthew Stevens
 Muhammad Sajjad 5–4 Noppadon Noppachorn
 John Higgins 5–2 Noppadon Noppachorn
 Sascha Lippe 3–5 Matthew Stevens
 Habib Subah 5–2 Muhammad Sajjad
 Sascha Lippe 1–5 Muhammad Sajjad
 Habib Subah 1–5 Matthew Stevens
 Sascha Lippe 4–5 Noppadon Noppachorn
 Muhammad Sajjad 2–5 Matthew Stevens
 John Higgins 5–2 Habib Subah
 Habib Subah 2–5 Noppadon Noppachorn
 John Higgins 5–2 Sascha Lippe

Group D

 Ryan Day 5–1 Au Chi Wai	
 Ken Doherty 5–3 Supoj Saenla
 Ang Boon Chin 2–5 Michael Holt
 Ken Doherty 5–2 Au Chi Wai
 Ryan Day 3–5 Michael Holt
 Ang Boon Chin 3–5 Supoj Saenla
 Au Chi Wai 3–5 Michael Holt
 Ryan Day 5–4 Ken Doherty
 Au Chi Wai 1–5 Ang Boon Chin
 Supoj Saenla 2–5 Michael Holt
 Au Chi Wai 2–5 Supoj Saenla
 Ken Doherty 5–3 Michael Holt
 Ryan Day 5–0 Ang Boon Chin
 Ryan Day 5–3 Supoj Saenla
 Ken Doherty 5–3 Ang Boon Chin

Group E

 Joe Perry 5–0 Yutaka Fukuda	
 Issara Kachaiwong 5–3 Joe Swail
 Jimmy White 5–1 Yutaka Fukuda
 Joe Perry 5–4 Mohammed Shehab
 Jimmy White 1–5 Issara Kachaiwong
 Mohammed Shehab 5–1 Joe Swail
 Yutaka Fukuda 1–5 Issara Kachaiwong
 Joe Perry 3–5 Issara Kachaiwong
 Yutaka Fukuda 1–5 Mohammed Shehab
 Jimmy White 5–4 Joe Swail
 Yutaka Fukuda 0–5 Joe Swail
 Jimmy White 3–5 Mohammed Shehab
 Joe Perry 5–3 Joe Swail
 Mohammed Shehab 2–5 Issara Kachaiwong
 Joe Perry 3–5 Jimmy White

Group F

 Darren Morgan 5–2 Noppadol Sangnil	
 Peter Ebdon 5–0 Raees Aslam
 Manan Chandra 1–5 Stuart Bingham
 Darren Morgan 5–2 Stuart Bingham
 Manan Chandra 2–5 Noppadol Sangnil
 Raees Aslam 2–5 Noppadol Sangnil
 Peter Ebdon 1–5 Darren Morgan
 Manan Chandra 5–2 Raees Aslam
 Noppadol Sangnil 5–2 Stuart Bingham
 Peter Ebdon 1–5 Stuart Bingham
 Darren Morgan 5–3 Manan Chandra
 Peter Ebdon 3–5 Manan Chandra
 Raees Aslam 5–1 Stuart Bingham
 Peter Ebdon 5–2 Noppadol Sangnil
 Darren Morgan 5–1 Raees Aslam

Group G

 Mark Williams 2–5 Dave Harold	
 Glen Wilkinson 5–4 Wael Talat
 Mohsen Abdul Aziz 3–5 Thepchaiya Un-nooh
 Mark Williams 5–0 Wael Talat
 Glen Wilkinson 0–5 Dave Harold
 Glen Wilkinson 3–5 Mohsen Abdul Aziz
 Wael Talat 2–5 Thepchaiya Un-nooh
 Wael Talat 5–1 Dave Harold
 Mark Williams 5–1 Mohsen Abdul Aziz
 Glen Wilkinson 2–5 Thepchaiya Un-nooh
 Mohsen Abdul Aziz 1–5 Dave Harold
 Thepchaiya Un-nooh 5–2 Dave Harold
 Mark Williams 5–0 Glen Wilkinson
 Wael Talat 5–0 Mohsen Abdul Aziz
 Mark Williams 5–0 Thepchaiya Un-nooh

Group H

 Mohammed Kayat 5–1 Nguyen Nhat Thanh	
 Mark King 5–2 Atthasit Mahitthi
 Brendan O’Donnoghue 1–5 Barry Hawkins
 Atthasit Mahitthi 4–5 Barry Hawkins
 Brendan O’Donnoghue 5–0 Nguyen Nhat Thanh
 Brendan O’Donnoghue 5–1 Atthasit Mahitthi
 Nguyen Nhat Thanh 1–5 Barry Hawkins
 Mark King 5–1 Mohammed Kayat
 Mohammed Kayat 0–5 Atthasit Mahitthi
 Mark King 5–1 Brendan O’Donnoghue
 Mark King 5–0 Nguyen Nhat Thanh
 Brendan O’Donnoghue 5–1 Mohammed Kayat
 Mark King 5–3 Barry Hawkins
 Nguyen Nhat Thanh 1–5 Atthasit Mahitthi
 Mohammed Kayat 1–5 Barry Hawkins

Knockout stage

Maximum breaks
(Note a maximum break in six-red snooker is 75)

 Michael Holt
 Ryan Day
 Jimmy White

References

2009
Six-red World Grand Prix
Six-red World Grand Prix